Maupérin (fl. 1766-) was a French painter of the 18th century who produced works for Louis XVI.

Maupérin was a painter of some reputation. On 31 December 1766, he obtained the third medal of the Académie Royale. He was a member of the Académie de Saint-Luc, where some of his works were put on display in 1774.

He notably painted the young Vietnamese Prince Nguyễn Phúc Cảnh, and Father Pigneau de Béhaine of the Paris Foreign Missions Society, during their embassy in Paris in 1787. These paintings are now located at the Paris Foreign Missions Society.

He also exhibited some of his works at the Louvre after the French Revolution.

Paintings

Notes

References
Les Missions Etrangères. Trois siècles et demi d'histoire et d'aventure en Asie Editions Perrin, 2008, 

18th-century French painters
French male painters
Year of birth missing
Year of death missing
18th-century French male artists